Pseudodoxia Epidemica or Enquiries into very many received tenents and commonly presumed truths, also known simply as Pseudodoxia Epidemica or Vulgar Errors, is a work by Thomas Browne challenging and refuting the "vulgar" or common errors and superstitions of his age. It first appeared in 1646 and went through five subsequent editions, the last revision occurring in 1672. The work includes evidence of Browne's adherence to the Baconian method of empirical observation of nature, and was in the vanguard of work-in-progress scientific journalism during the 17th-century scientific revolution. Throughout its pages frequent examples of Browne's subtle humour can also be found.

Browne's three determinants for obtaining truth were the authority of past scholarly works, the act of reason, and empirical experience. Each of these determinants is employed upon subjects ranging from common folklore to the cosmological. Subjects covered in Pseudodoxia Epidemica are arranged in accordance to the time-honoured Renaissance scale of creation; the learned doctor essaying on the nature of error itself (Book 1), continuing with fallacies  in the mineral, vegetable (Book 2), and animal (Book 3) kingdoms onto errors concerning Man (Book 4), Art (Book 5), Geography and History (Book 6), and finally Astronomy and the Cosmos (Book 7).

Popular science
Pseudodoxia Epidemica was a valuable source of information which found itself upon the shelves of many homes in seventeenth century England. Being in the vanguard of the scientific writing, it paved the way for  much subsequent popular scientific journalism and began a decline in the belief in mythical creatures. Its science includes many examples of Browne's 'at-first-hand' empiricism  as well as early examples of the formulation of scientific hypothesis.

The second of Pseudodoxia Epidemica'''s  seven books entitled Tenets concerning Mineral and Vegetable Bodies includes Browne's experiments with static electricity and magnetism — the word electricity being one of hundreds of neologisms including medical, pathology, hallucination, literary, and computer contributed by Browne into the vocabulary of the early scientific revolution.

Editions
The popularity of Pseudodoxia in its day is confirmed by the fact that it went through no fewer than six editions. The first appeared in 1646 during the reign of Charles I and during the English Civil War; four during the interregnum, in 1650, 1658 (two), and 1659; and the final edition in 1672, during the reign of Charles II, and when the scientific revolution was well under way. Pseudodoxia was  subsequently translated and published in French, Dutch, Latin and German throughout the late seventeenth and early eighteenth centuries. The German Christian Cabalist Christian Knorr von Rosenroth translated the book into German in 1680.

Evaluation by other writers
Today there is considerable confusion how best to define Sir Thomas Browne's scientific methodology, which is described by E. S. Merton thus:

William P. Dunn summarised the ambiguities of Browne's scientific view-point thus:

Robert Sencourt succinctly defined Browne's relationship to scientific enquiry as "an instance of a scientific reason, lit up by mysticism, in the Church of England".

The 1651 book Arcana Microcosmi, by Alexander Ross, attempted to rebut many of Browne's claims.

Sources

A detailed edition of Pseudodoxia Epidemica in 2 volumes was published by Oxford University Press in 1986, edited and comprehensively annotated by Robin Robbins.

See also
 Browne's Index to Pseudodoxia Epidemica: entitled  An Alphabetical Table, records the wide spectrum of subjects covered
Library of Sir Thomas Browne
Francis BaconNaturalis Historia''
Popular science

References

External links

 Online edition
 Facsimile of 4th edition

1646 books
1672 books
Works by Thomas Browne